The 1975 Open Championship was the 104th Open Championship, played 9–13 July at Carnoustie Golf Links in Scotland. In his first Open, Tom Watson won an 18-hole playoff by one stroke over Jack Newton to win the first of his eight major titles, which included five Open Championships.

Final round
After three days of calm weather, the wind kicked up during the final round on Saturday and scores went up. Bobby Cole, the leader at 54 holes after back-to-back rounds of 66, shot a four-over 76 and missed the playoff by a stroke. Watson managed an even-par 72, capped with a  birdie putt on the 72nd hole to tie Newton, who shot 74 (+2).

Playoff
The Sunday playoff was back-and-forth in the rain, and included a chip-in eagle by Watson at the 14th hole, the short par-5 named "Spectacles." Newton had chipped to within inches and tapped in for birdie. The two were tied at the 18th tee, the par-4 "Home" with the meandering Barry Burn. Newton's lengthy sand shot ran  past the hole. After Watson had safely two-putted for par, Newton's putt to save par and extend the match missed left and Watson won the title.

This was the second and final 18-hole playoff at the Open; the first was in 1970, won by Jack Nicklaus. The format was changed to a four-hole aggregate playoff in 1985, first used in 1989.  Prior to 1964, the playoff at the Open was 36 holes.

Course layout
Carnoustie Golf Links – Championship Course

^ The 6th hole was renamed Hogan's Alley in 2003

Lengths of the course for previous Opens:

 1968: , par 72
 1953: , par 72
 1937: , par 72
 1931: , par 72

Past champions in the field

Made both cuts

Missed the second cut

Missed the first cut

Round summaries

First round
Wednesday, 9 July 1975

Second round
Thursday, 10 July 1975

Source:

Amateurs: Stephen (+1), Poxon (+5), Stadler (+5), Price (+10), Levenson (+13).

Third round
Friday, 11 July 1975

Amateurs: Stadler (+7), Stephen (+7), Poxon (+11).

Final round
Saturday, 12 July 1975

Source:

Playoff
Sunday, 13 July 1975

Scorecard

Source:

References

External links
Carnoustie 1975 (Official site)
104th Open Championship - Carnoustie (European Tour)

The Open Championship
Golf tournaments in Scotland
Sport in Angus, Scotland
Open Championship
Open Championship
Open Championship